Chandsuraj is a village located in Salekasa, within the Gondiya district of Maharashtra, India. Its population is 626 as of 2011.
It is famous as the place where the first sunrise in Maharashtra

References 

Villages in Gondia district